Jiti Jitayi Politics is a political party founded by transgender/Hijra (South Asia) people in Madhya Pradesh, India, on 17 October 2003. The party president at that time was Suraiya.

References 

Political parties in Madhya Pradesh
2003 establishments in Madhya Pradesh
Political parties established in 2003